The men's 800 metres event at the 2001 Summer Universiade was held at the Workers Stadium in Beijing, China between 30 August and 1 September.

Medalists

Results

Heats

Semifinals

Final

References

Athletics at the 2001 Summer Universiade
2001